Os Aspones  is a Brazilian television sitcom that aired on Rede Globo from November 5 to December 17, 2004. It was created by Fernanda Young and Alexandre Machado. The series, which portrayed a group of white-collar workers at a governmental department lost in Brazilian bureaucracy in Brasília which actually has no function at all, starred Selton Mello, Andréa Beltrão, Pedro Paulo Rangel, Marisa Orth and Drica Moraes.  The show's title is a Portuguese blend word formed from the phrase "assessor de porra [or porcaria] nenhuma" (literally "assistant of fucking nothing").

Synopsis 
It featured a group of public officials, better known as aspones (Advisors of No Crap), who work at FMDO (Ministerial Binder of Mandatory Documents), a public office where you have nothing to do. Thus, they create the FMDO (Speaking Bad Of Others), which makes them ridicule among themselves and those who go there.

Cast and characters
 Selton Mello as Tales
 Andréa Beltrão as Leda Maria
 Pedro Paulo Rangel as Caio
 Marisa Orth as Anete
 Drica Moraes as Moira

References

External links
 
  Os Aspones at Teledramaturgia
  Os Aspones at Vestiário

2000s sitcoms
2000s workplace comedy television series
2004 Brazilian television series debuts
2004 Brazilian television series endings
Brazilian comedy television series
The Office
Portuguese-language television shows
Rede Globo original programming
Television shows set in Brasília